The 1994 Western Kentucky Hilltoppers football team represented Western Kentucky University as an independent during the 1994 NCAA Division I-AA football season Led by sixth-year head coach Jack Harbaugh, the Hilltoppers compiled a record of 5–6. The team's captains were Sheldon Benoit and Lito Mason.

Schedule

References

Western Kentucky
Western Kentucky Hilltoppers football seasons
Western Kentucky Hilltoppers football